Howmeh Rural District is in the Central District of Dashtestan County, Bushehr province, Iran. At the census of 2006, its population was 6,838 in 1,500 households; there were 8,148 inhabitants in 1,929 households at the following census of 2011; and in the most recent census of 2016, the population of the rural district was 9,603 in 2,405 households. The largest of its 14 villages was Bondaruz, with 3,724 people.

References 

Rural Districts of Bushehr Province
Populated places in Dashtestan County